Misezero is an administrative ward n Muhambwe Constituency in Kibondo District of Kigoma Region in Tanzania. 
In 2016 the Tanzania National Bureau of Statistics report there were 9,049 people in the ward, from 8,221 in 2012.

Villages / neighborhoods 
The ward has 2 villages and 40 hamlets.

Twabagondozi
 Nyesogo

Kumukugwa

 Bitare Kata
 Kamilanzovu
 Kamlama
 Kanyamajeli
 Kavuruga
 Kichamate
 Kimlombo
 Kisonzola
 Kiyagala
 Kumgoboka
 Kumuhama A
 Kumuhama B
 Majengo Mapya
 Malenga
 Mayengo
 Mibhale A
 Mibhale B
 Mibhale C
 Mibhale D
 Misezero
 Mkubezi A
 Mkubezi B
 Mkubezi C
 Mpebhe
 Mtaho A
 Mtaho B
 Namuyange
 Narukinga
 Ntakabalagi
 Nyamata
 Nyamihanda A
 Nyamihanda B
 Nyangwe
 Nyavyugi
 Nyerere
 Nyetabhi
 Rubanga
 Rubanga
 Vyigero

References

Kibondo District
Wards of Kigoma Region
Constituencies of Tanzania